Blue Chips 7000 is the third studio album by American rapper Action Bronson. It is the third and final installment in his Blue Chips series, following 2013's mixtape Blue Chips 2. The album was released on August 25, 2017, by Atlantic Records and Vice Records.

Critical reception

Blue Chips 7000 received generally positive reviews from critics. At Metacritic, which assigns a normalized rating out of 100 to reviews from mainstream publications, the album received an average score of 76, based on 6 reviews.

Justin Ivey of HipHopDX praised Bronson and his producers for crafting humorous lyricism with tight and upbeat instrumentation, calling it "a triumphant moment for [Action Bronson] the rapper, re-establishing his position as the court jester of Hip Hop. It’s unabashedly fun and a refreshing celebration of sample-based beats in a genre largely moving away from them." Riley Wallace of Exclaim! also commended Bronson's penchant for "straight-up bars" throughout the track list, despite lacking in emotional introspection or social commentary, saying that, "While the project does have a mixtape feel to it as opposed to an album, it delivers a lot of heat. If you're a fan of the Fuck, That's Delicious host, then this project is a must-listen." Jay Balfour, writing for Pitchfork, praised the songs for their diverse production and upfront brag raps, saying that "these new tracks are probably the strongest in his catalog—full of cheeky, relentless verses to match the energetic funk he’s best accompanied by—and the repetition feels strategic." AllMusic's Andy Kellman gave note of the production involving "scuttling percussion, noodling electric pianos, and rubbery basslines" that showcase Bronson's "nasal, humor-laced self-praise and subtle jabs at himself," concluding that "At all times, Bronson's enthusiasm for nourishment, sexual exploits, professional sports references, and inhalants remains at a high level."

Track listing

Charts

In popular culture
"The Chairman's Intent" is used by AEW  wrestler Hook as his entrance theme.

References

2017 albums
Action Bronson albums
Albums produced by the Alchemist (musician)
Albums produced by Harry Fraud
Albums produced by Daringer (producer)
Atlantic Records albums
Albums produced by Knxwledge